IXL may refer to: 

 iXL (interactive agency), an American interactive agency during the late 1990s
 IXL, Oklahoma, a town in America
 IXL Historical Museum, a historic building in Hermansville, Michigan, and IXL, a brand of flooring
 Henry Jones IXL, an Australian manufacturer of jams and other foods, and IXL, a brand name
 Kushok Bakula Rimpochee Airport (IATA: IXL), in Leh, Ladakh, India
 A railway interlocking
 A gramogram for the phrase, "I excel"; see